Laura Boylan (born 16 December 1991) is an Irish former cricketer who played as a right-arm medium bowler and right-handed batter. She appeared in 4 One Day Internationals and 3 Twenty20 Internationals for Ireland between 2011 and 2017. She played in the Super 3s for Typhoons.

References

External links
 
 

1991 births
Living people
Irish women cricketers
Ireland women One Day International cricketers
Ireland women Twenty20 International cricketers
People from County Louth
Typhoons (women's cricket) cricketers